The knockout stage of the EuroBasket 2022 took place between 10 and 18 September 2022. All games were played at the Mercedes-Benz Arena in Berlin, Germany.

Qualified teams

Bracket

All times are local (UTC+2).

Round of 16

Turkey vs France

Slovenia vs Belgium

Germany vs Montenegro

Spain vs Lithuania

Ukraine vs Poland

Finland vs Croatia

Serbia vs Italy

Greece vs Czech Republic

Quarterfinals

Spain vs Finland

Germany vs Greece

France vs Italy

Slovenia vs Poland

Semifinals

Poland vs France
France blew out Poland to record the largest semifinal victory in EuroBasket history.

Germany vs Spain

Third place game

Final

References

External links
Official website

knockout stage